Petrogradets was a Russian professional cycling team, which competed in elite road bicycle racing events such as the UCI Women's Road World Cup. For the 2010 season, the team merged with Fenixs.

Major wins
2008
Stage 5 Gracia–Orlová, Alexandra Burchenkova 
Stage 2 Wyscig Etapowy–Zamość, Alexandra Burchenkova

2009
 Overall Tour de Feminin - O cenu Ceskeho Svycarska, Alexandra Burchenkova 
Stages 1 & 3 (ITT), Alexandra Burchenkova 
Stages 4 & 5, Elena Novikova

National and continental champions
2009
 Kazakhstan Time Trial, Mariya Slokotovich
 Russia Road Race, Yulia Iliynikh

References

Defunct cycling teams based in Russia
UCI Women's Teams
Cycling teams established in 2008
Cycling teams disestablished in 2009
2008 establishments in Russia
2009 disestablishments in Russia